Neutrophil hypersegmentation can be defined as the presence of neutrophils whose nuclei have six or more lobes or the presence of more than 3% of neutrophils with at least five nuclear lobes. This is a clinical laboratory finding. It is visualized by drawing blood from a patient and viewing the blood smeared on a slide under a microscope. Normal neutrophils are uniform in size, with an apparent diameter of about 13 μm in a film. When stained, neutrophils have a segmented nucleus and pink/orange cytoplasm under light microscope. The majority of neutrophils have three nuclear segments (lobes) connected by tapering chromatin strands. A small percentage have four lobes, and occasionally five lobes may be seen. Up to 8% of circulating neutrophils are unsegmented (‘band’ forms).

The presence of hypersegmented neutrophils is an important diagnostic feature of megaloblastic anaemias. Hypersegmentation can also be seen in many other condition but with relatively less diagnostic significance.

Hypersegmentation can sometimes be difficult to assert since interobserver variation is high and segmentation may vary with race. A 1996 study performed in the United States found that blacks have a greater neutrophil segmentation than whites.

Association with other diseases

Megaloblastic anemia
Neutrophil hypersegmentation is one of the earliest, most sensitive and specific signs of megaloblastic anemia (mainly caused by hypovitaminosis of vitamin B12 & folic acid). Nuclear hypersegmentation of DNA in neutrophils strongly suggests megaloblastosis when associated with macro-ovalocytosis. If megaloblastosis is suspected, a formal lobe count/neutrophil (i.e. lobe index) above 3.5% can be obtained. Hypersegmentation persists for an average of 14 days after institution of specific therapy.

Other causes
 Hereditary hypersegmentation
 Acute megaloblastic anaemia secondary to nitrous oxide anaesthesia
 Myelodysplastic syndrome (MDS)
 Myeloproliferative disorders
 Chronic myelogenous leukemia (CML)
 Myelofibrosis
 Chronic infections
 Chemotherapeutic & Cytotoxic drugs
 5-fluorouracil
 Hydroxyurea
 Hydroxycarbamide
 Methotrexate
 Following Granulocyte colony stimulating Factor (G-CSF) administration
 Steroid therapy for immune thrombocytopenic purpura (ITP)
 Iron deficiency anaemia

References

Monocyte and granulocyte disorders
Histology
Cell biology
Granulocytes
Phagocytes
Human cells
Anatomical pathology
 
Hematopathology
Abnormal clinical and laboratory findings for blood